The WSA World Tour 2011 is the international squash tour and organized circuit, organized by the Women's Squash Association (WSA) for the 2011 squash season. The most important tournament in the series is the World Open held in Rotterdam in the Netherlands. The tour features three categories of regular events, the World Series, which features the highest prize money and the best fields, Gold and Silver tournaments. The Tour is concluded by the WSA World Series Finals, the end of season championship for the top 8 rated players.

2011 Calendar

World Open

World Series

Gold 50

Silver 30

Silver 20

Year end world top 10 players

Retirements
Following is a list of notable players (winners of a main tour title, and/or part of the WSA World Rankings top 30 for at least one month) who announced their retirement from professional squash, became inactive, or were permanently banned from playing, during the 2011 season:

 Vanessa Atkinson (born 10 March 1976 in Newcastle, England) joined the pro tour in 1995, reached the world no. 1 ranking in December 2005. Keeping the spot for four month in 2005. She won the World Open in 2004 against Natalie Grinham. She also has won major tournaments as the Qatar Classic, the Malaysian Open, the Tournament of Champions in New York and the US Open. She retired in August after win the Nottingham Open, the 24th WSA World Tour title of her career.
 Isabelle Stoehr (born 9 June 1979 in Tours, France) joined the pro tour in 1996, reached the singles no. 10 spot in February 2009. She won 7 WSA World Tour titles including the Alexandria Open and the WISPA des Pyramides. She retired in November after competing the Qatar Classic.
 Rebecca Chiu (born 24 November 1978 in Hong Kong) joined the pro tour in 1993, reached the singles no. 13 spot in October 2007. She won 16 WSA World Tour titles including Japan Open in 2001 and the Singapore Open in 2004. She retired in February 2011.
 Tenille Swartz (born 13 May 1987 in Parys, South Africa) joined the pro tour in 2006, reached the singles no. 28 spot in April 2008. She won 2 WSA World Tour titles. She retired in November after losing in the first round of the Qatar Classic.

See also
Official Women's Squash World Ranking
Women's Squash Association
WSA World Series 2011
PSA World Tour 2011

References

External links
 WSA website

WSA World Tour seasons
2011 in squash